Charaxes montis is a butterfly in the family Nymphalidae. It is found in the Democratic Republic of the Congo, south-western Uganda, Rwanda and Burundi. The habitat consists of montane forests.

The larvae feed on Albizia gummifera.

Taxonomy
Described as a subspecies of Charaxes dilutus, later regarded as a full species by Victor Van Someren.

Similar species
Charaxes subornatus is in the  Charaxes eupale species group (clade). The clade members are:

Charaxes subornatus
Charaxes eupale
Charaxes dilutus
Charaxes montis
Charaxes minor
Charaxes schiltzei
Charaxes schultzei
Charaxes virescens
Bouyer et al., 2008 erected the genus Viridixes Bouyer & Vingerhoedt, 2008 to accommodate species belonging to the eupale species group.

Realm
Afrotropical realm

References

Victor Gurney Logan Van Someren, 1974 Revisional notes on African Charaxes (Lepidoptera: Nymphalidae). Part IX. Bulletin of the British Museum of Natural History (Entomology) 29 (8):415-487. 
Bouyer, T., Zakharov, E., Rougerie, R. & Vingerhoedt, E. (2008): Les Charaxes du groupe eupale : description d’un nouveau genre, révision et approche génétique (Lepidoptera, Nymphalidae, Charaxinae) Entomologica Africana Hors Série 3:1-32.

External links
African Charaxes/Charaxes Africains Eric Vingerhoedt images of eupale group
Images of  C. montis Royal Museum for Central Africa (Albertine Rift Project)
Charaxes montis images at Consortium for the Barcode of Life

Butterflies described in 1956
montis